Yasuhiko is both a masculine Japanese given name and a Japanese surname.

Possible writings
Yasuhiko can be written using different combinations of kanji characters. Here are some examples:

康彦, "healthy, elegant boy"
康比古, "healthy, young man (archaic)"
靖彦, "peaceful, elegant boy"
安彦, "tranquil, elegant boy"
保彦, "preserve, elegant boy"
泰彦, "peaceful, elegant boy"
易彦, "divination, elegant boy"
恭彦, "respectful, elegant boy"

The name can also be written in hiragana やすひこ or katakana ヤスヒコ.

Notable people with the given name Yasuhiko
 , Japanese physicist
 Prince Asaka Yasuhiko (朝香宮 鳩彦王, 1906–1981), officer in the Imperial Japanese Army
Yasuhiko Kawamura (河村 保彦, 1940–2012), Japanese baseball player
 Yasuhiko Kawazu (川津 泰彦, born 1966), Japanese voice actor
 Yasuhiko Yabuta (薮田 安彦, born 1973), Japanese baseball pitcher
 Yasuhiko Imai (今井 靖彦, born 1965), Japanese stunt man
 Yasuhiko Fukuoka (福岡 保彦, born ), Japanese composer
 Yasuhiko Fukuda (福田 裕彦, born 1957), Japanese composer
 , Japanese wheel gymnastics acrobat
 , Japanese rower

Notable people with the surname Yasuhiko
 Yoshikazu Yasuhiko (安彦 良和, born 1947), Japanese animator and manga artist

See also
 18818 Yasuhiko, a main-belt asteroid

Japanese masculine given names